The Samsung Pebble is a small MP3/Ogg audio player shaped like a flat, round pebble.

Featuring no screen, the Pebble is meant to be worn around the neck like a pendant. It has features such as on-the-go and sound effects buttons on the side. The Pebble comes in 1 GB, 2 GB or 4 GB. It also features a shuffle feature similar to the iPod. The Pebble was released in 2012.

References

External links 

Portable audio players
Pebble